Sıqalonu (also, Sığaloni) is a village and municipality in the Astara Rayon of Azerbaijan.  It has a population of 403.

References 

Populated places in Astara District